Agnolo di Cosimo (17 November 150323 November 1572), usually known as Bronzino or Agnolo Bronzino, was an Italian Mannerist painter from Florence. His sobriquet, Bronzino, may refer to his relatively dark skin or reddish hair.

He lived all his life in Florence, and from his late 30s was kept busy as the court painter of Cosimo I de' Medici, Grand Duke of Tuscany. He was mainly a portraitist but also painted many religious subjects, and a few allegorical subjects, which include what is probably his best-known work, Venus, Cupid, Folly and Time, c. 1544–45, now in London. Many portraits of the Medicis exist in several versions with varying degrees of participation by Bronzino himself, as Cosimo was a pioneer of the copied portrait sent as a diplomatic gift.

He trained with Pontormo, the leading Florentine painter of the first generation of Mannerism, and his style was greatly influenced by him, but his elegant and somewhat elongated figures always appear calm and somewhat reserved, lacking the agitation and emotion of those by his teacher. They have often been found cold and artificial, and his reputation suffered from the general critical disfavour attached to Mannerism in the 19th and early 20th centuries.  Recent decades have been more appreciative of his art.

Life

Bronzino was born in Florence, the son of a butcher. According to his contemporary Vasari, Bronzino was a pupil first of Raffaellino del Garbo, and then of Pontormo, to whom he was apprenticed at 14. Pontormo is thought to have introduced a portrait of Bronzino as a child (seated on a step) into one of his series on Joseph in Egypt now in the National Gallery, London. Pontormo exercised a dominant influence on Bronzino's developing style, and the two were to remain collaborators for most of the former's life. An early example of Bronzino's hand has often been detected in the Capponi Chapel in the church of Santa Felicita by the Ponte Vecchio in Florence. Pontormo designed the interior and executed the altarpiece, the masterly Deposition from the Cross and the sidewall fresco Annunciation. Bronzino apparently was assigned the frescoes on the dome, which have not survived. Of the four empanelled tondi or roundels depicting each of the evangelists, two were said by Vasari to have been painted by Bronzino. His style is so similar to his master's that scholars still debate the specific attributions.

Towards the end of his life, Bronzino took a prominent part in the activities of the Florentine Accademia delle Arti del Disegno, of which he was a founding member in 1563.

The painter Alessandro Allori was his favourite pupil, and Bronzino was living in the Allori family house at the time of his death in Florence in 1572 (Alessandro was also the father of Cristofano Allori). Bronzino spent the majority of his career in Florence.

Work

Portraits

Bronzino first received Medici patronage in 1539, when he was one of the many artists chosen to execute the elaborate decorations for the wedding of Cosimo I de' Medici to Eleonora di Toledo, daughter of the Viceroy of Naples. It was not long before he became, and remained for most of his career, the official court painter of the Duke and his court. His portrait figures – often read as static, elegant, and stylish exemplars of unemotional haughtiness and assurance – influenced the course of European court portraiture for a century. These well known paintings exist in many workshop versions and copies. In addition to images of the Florentine elite, Bronzino also painted idealized portraits of the poets Dante (c. 1530, now in Washington, DC) and Petrarch.

Bronzino's best-known works comprise the aforementioned series of the duke and duchess, Cosimo and Eleonora, and figures of their court such as Bartolomeo Panciatichi and his wife Lucrezia. These paintings, especially those of the duchess, are known for their minute attention to the detail of her costume, which almost takes on a personality of its own in the image at right.  Here the Duchess is pictured with her second son Giovanni, who died of malaria in 1562, along with his mother; however it is the sumptuous fabric of the dress that takes up more space on the canvas than either of the sitters.  Indeed, the dress itself has been the object of some scholarly debate.  The elaborate gown has been rumoured to be so beloved by the duchess that she was ultimately buried in it; when this myth was debunked, others suggested that perhaps the garment never existed at all and Bronzino invented the entire thing, perhaps working only from a fabric swatch.  In any case, this picture was reproduced over and over again by Bronzino and his shop, becoming one of the most iconic images of the duchess.  The version pictured here is in the Uffizi Gallery, and is one of the finest surviving examples.

Bronzino's so-called "allegorical portraits", such as that of a Genoese admiral, Portrait of Andrea Doria as Neptune, are less typical but possibly even more fascinating owing to the peculiarity of placing a publicly recognized personality in the nude as a mythical figure.  Finally, in addition to being a painter, Bronzino was also a poet, and his most personal portraits are perhaps those of other literary figures such as that of his friend the poet Laura Battiferri. The eroticized nature of these virile nude male portraits, as well as homoerotic references in his poetry, have led scholars to believe that Bronzino was homosexual.

Religious and allegorical subjects

In 1540/41, Bronzino began work on the fresco decoration of the Chapel of Eleanora di Toledo in the Palazzo Vecchio and an oil on panel Deposition of Christ to be an altarpiece for the chapel. Before this commission, his style in the religious genre was less Mannerist, and was based in balanced compositions of the High Renaissance. Yet he became elegant and classicizing (cf. Smyth) in this fresco cycle, and his religious works are examples of the mid-16th-century aesthetics of the Florentine court – traditionally interpreted as highly stylized and non-personal or emotive.  Crossing the Red Sea is typical of Bronzino's approach at this time, though it should not be claimed that Bronzino or the court was lacking in religious fervour on the basis of the preferred court fashion.  Indeed, the duchess Eleanora was a generous patron to the recently founded Jesuit order.

Bronzino's work tends to include sophisticated references to earlier painters, as in one of his last grand frescoes called The Martyrdom of St. Lawrence (San Lorenzo, 1569), in which almost every one of the extraordinarily contorted poses can be traced back to Raphael or to Michelangelo, whom Bronzino idolized (cf. Brock).  Bronzino's skill with the nude was even more enigmatically deployed in the celebrated Venus, Cupid, Folly and Time, which conveys strong feelings of eroticism under the pretext of a moralizing allegory. His other major works include the design of a series of tapestries on The Story of Joseph, for the Palazzo Vecchio.

Many of Bronzino's works are still in Florence but other examples can be found in the National Gallery, London, and elsewhere.

Selected works

 
 St. Mark (c. 1525) - Oil on Wood, Capponi Chapel, Santa Felicita, Florence
 St. Matthew (c. 1525) - Oil on Wood, Capponi Chapel, Santa Felicita, Florence
 Portrait of Lorenzo Lenzi (1527–28) - Oil on panel, castello Sforzesco, Milan
 Pietà (c. 1530) - Oil on panel, 105 x 100 cm, Uffizi, Florence
 Portrait of Dante (1530) - Oil on panel, Milan
 Portrait of a Lady in Green (1530–32) - Oil on panel, 76,7 x 65,4 cm, Royal Collection, Windsor
 St. Sebastian (c. 1533) - Oil on panel, 87 x 77 cm, Museo Thyssen-Bornemisza, Madrid
 Holy Family (1534–40) - Oil on wood, 124.5 x 99.5 cm, Kunsthistorisches Museum, Vienna
 Adoration of the Shepherds (1535–1540) - Oil on wood, 65,3 x 46,7 cm, Museum of Fine Arts, Budapest
 Portrait of Ugolino Martelli (before 1537) - Oil on panel, 102 x 85 cm, State Museums, Berlin
 Portrait of Bartolomeo Panciatichi (c. 1540) - Tempera on wood, 104 x 84 cm, Uffizi, Florence
 Holy Family (c. 1540) - Oil on wood, 117 x 93 cm, Uffizi, Florence
 Portrait of a Young Man with a Book (c. 1540) - Oil on wood, 96 x 75 cm, Metropolitan Museum of Art, New York
 Venus, Cupid, Folly and Time (Allegory; 1540–45) - Oil on panel, 146 x 116 cm, National Gallery, London
 Adoration of the Bronze Snake (1540–45) - Fresco, 320 x 385 cm, Palazzo Vecchio, Florence
 Deposition of Christ (1540–45) - Oil on panel, 268 x 173 cm, Musée des Beaux- Arts, Besançon
Alessandro de Médici (1540–1553) Oil on panel, 34,90 x 26,20 cm, Cerralbo Museum, Madrid.
 Crossing of the Red Sea (1541–42) - Fresco, 320 x 490 cm, Palazzo Vecchio, Florence
 Portrait of a Young Girl (1541–45) - Oil on wood, 58 x 46,5 cm, Uffizi, Florence
 Portrait of Bia de' Medici (c. 1542) - Tempera on panel, 63 x 48 cm, Uffizi, Florence
 Portrait of Cosimo I de' Medici (1545) - Oil on panel, 74 x 58 cm,  Uffizi, Florence
Portrait of Cosimo I de' Medici (c.1545) - Oil on panel, 76,5 x 59 cm, Museo Thyssen-Bornemisza, Madrid.
 Portrait of Giovanni de' Medici as a Child (c. 1545) - Oil on wood, 58 x 46 cm, Uffizi, Florence
 Portrait of Eleanor of Toledo (c. 1545) - Oil on panel, 115 x 96 cm,  Uffizi, Florence
 Portrait of Lucrezia Panciatichi (c. 1545) - Oil on panel, 101 x 82.8 cm, Uffizi, Florence
 Christ on the Cross (c. 1545) - Oil on panel, 145 x 115 cm, Musée des Beaux-Arts, Nice
 Portrait of Stefano Colonna (1546) - Oil on panel, 125 x 95 cm, Galleria Nazionale d'Arte Antica, Rome
 Portrait of Don Garcia de' Medici (1550) - Oil on panel, Museo del Prado, Madrid
 Portrait of a Lady (c. 1550) - Oil on wood, 109 x 85 cm, Galleria Sabauda, Turin
 PortraIt of a Young Man (possibly Pierino da Vinci) (c. 1550)
 Venus, Cupid and Jealousy (or Envy) (c. 1550) - Oil on wood, 192 x 142 cm, Szépművészeti Múzeum, Budapest
 Portrait of Andrea Doria as Neptune (1550–1555) - Oil on canvas, 115 x 53 cm, Pinacoteca di Brera, Milan
 St. John the Baptist (1550–1555) - Oil on wood, 120 x 92 cm, Galleria Borghese, Rome
 Portrait of Pierantonio Bandini (c.1550–1555) - Oil on wood, 106,7 x 82,5 cm, National Gallery of Canada
 Portrait of Francesco I de' Medici (1551) - Tempera on wood, 58.5 x 41.5 cm, Uffizi, Florence
 Portrait of Maria de' Medici (1551) - Tempera on wood, 52.5 x 38 cm, Uffizi, Florence
 Portrait of Ludovico Capponi (1551) - Oil on wood, 117 x 86 cm, Frick Collection, New York
 Christ in Limbo, 1552, Florence, Museo dell'Opera di Santa Croce
 Portrait of the Dwarf Nano Morgante (1552)
 Holy Family (1555–1560) - Tempera on wood, 117 x 99 cm, Pushkin Museum, Moscow
 Portrait of Laura Battiferri (1555–1560) - Oil on canvas, 83 x 60 cm, Palazzo Vecchio, Florence
 Noli me tangere (1561) - Oil on canvas, 291 x 195 cm, Musée du Louvre, Paris
 Allegory of Happiness (1564) - Oil on copper, 40 x 30 cm, Uffizi, Florence
 Deposition of Christ (1565) - Oil on wood, 350 x 235 cm, Galleria dell'Accademia, Florence
 Martyrdom of St. Lawrence (1569) - Fresco, San Lorenzo, Florence

References
Footnotes

Citations

Further reading
 Maurice Brock, Bronzino, Edition du Régard, Paris 2002. 
 The Drawings of Bronzino, exh. cat. ed. by Carmen C. Bambach, contr. by Elizabeth Pilliod, Marzia Faietti, Janet Cox-Rearick, Philippe Costamagna, The Metropolitan Museum of Art, New York , 978-0-300-15512-9
 Bronzino: pittore e poeta alla corte dei Medici, exh. cat. ed. by Antonio Natali e Carlo Falciani, Palazzo Strozzi, Florence 2010–11. .

External links

 Bronzino: artist and poet. InToscana.
 Agnolo Bronzino's Biography, Style and Artworks
 The National Gallery: Agnolo Bronzino
 Biography Angolo Bronzino at Encyclopaedia Britannica 
 Palazzo Strozzi, Florence/Bruce Adolphe's "Of Art and Onions: Homage to Bronzino"
Italian Paintings: Florentine School, a collection catalog containing information about the artist and his works (see pages: 200–204).

1503 births
1572 deaths
16th-century Italian painters
Italian male painters
Painters from Florence
Italian Mannerist painters
Italian portrait painters
Court painters
16th century in LGBT history